Girolamo Michele Nichesola (died August 1566) was a Roman Catholic prelate who served as Bishop of Teano (1535–1556).

Biography
Girolamo Michele Nichesola was ordained a priest in the Order of Preachers.
On 11 January 1557, he was appointed by Pope Paul IV as Bishop of Teano. 
He served as Bishop of Teano until his death in August 1566.

References

External links and additional sources
 (for Chronology of Bishops) 
 (for Chronology of Bishops) 

16th-century Italian Roman Catholic bishops
1566 deaths
Bishops appointed by Pope Paul IV
Dominican bishops